is a train station in the city of Matsumoto, Nagano Prefecture, Japan, operated by East Japan Railway Company (JR East).

Lines
Kita-Matsumoto Station is served by the Ōito Line and is 0.7 kilometers from the terminus of the line at Matsumoto Station.

Station layout
The station consists of one ground-level island platform, connected by an elevated station building. The station is a  Kan'i itaku station.

Platforms

History
Three months later, on 5 April 1915, a new Matsumoto Station was built, and the original station was renamed Kita-Matsumoto and used for freight operations only. Passenger operations resumed on 18 September 1916. With the privatization of Japanese National Railways (JNR) on 1 April 1987, the station came under the control of JR East. A new elevated station building was completed in April 2000.

Passenger statistics
In fiscal 2015, the station was used by an average of 756 passengers daily (boarding passengers only).

Surrounding area
Matsumoto Castle
Kaichi School Museum

See also
 List of railway stations in Japan

References

External links

 JR East station information 

Railway stations in Matsumoto City
Ōito Line
Railway stations in Japan opened in 1915
Stations of East Japan Railway Company